The Bingham Medal is an annual award for outstanding contributions to the field of rheology awarded  at the Annual Meeting of The Society of Rheology.  It was instituted in 1948 by the society to commemorate Eugene C. Bingham (1878–1945).

List of Award Winners
Source : Society of Rheology

1948 Melvin Mooney
1949 Henry Eyring
1950 William F. Fair, Jr., Koppers Co.
1951 Percy Williams Bridgman
1952 Arpad L. Nadai, Westinghouse Electric
1953 John D. Ferry
1954 Turner Alfrey, Dow Chemical Co
1955 Herbert Leaderman, National Bureau of Standards
1956 Arthur V. Tobolsky
1957 Clarence Zener
1958 Ronald Rivlin 
1959 Egon Orowan
1960 Bruno Zimm, University of California at San Diego
1961 William R. Willets, Titanium Pigment Corp.
1962 Wladimir Philippoff, New Jersey Inst. of Technology
1963 Clifford A. Truesdell
1964 Jan M. Burgers
1965 Eugene Guth 
1966 Prince E. Rouse, Los Alamos Scientific Lab.
1967 Hershel Markovitz, Mellon Institute
1968 Jerald L. Ericksen
1969 Stanley G. Mason, McGill University
1970 Anton Peterlin
1971 Arthur S. Lodge
1972 Richard S. Stein 
1973 Robert Simha, Case Western Reserve University
1974 Robert B. Bird
1975 Alan N. Gent, University of Akron
1976 Lawrence E. Nielsen, Monsanto Company
1977 Arthur B. Metzner
1978 Thor L. Smith, IBM, Almaden Research Center
1979 William W. Graessley, Northwestern University
1980 Howard Brenner
1981 James L. White, University of Akron
1982 Edward B. Bagley, USDA, Northern Regional Research Center
1983 Frederick R. Eirich, Polytechnic Institute of New York
1984 Bernard D. Coleman, Rutgers University
1985 Roger S. Porter, University of Massachusetts-Amherst
1986 Morton M. Denn, University of California at Berkeley
1987 Charles F. Curtiss, University of Wisconsin-Madison
1988 William R. Schowalter, Princeton University
1989 Irvin M. Krieger, Case Western Reserve University
1990 Guy C. Berry, Carnegie Mellon University
1991 Louis J. Zapas, National Bureau of Standards
1992 Kurt F. Wissbrun, Hoechst-Celanese Company
1993 Daniel D. Joseph
1994 Andreas Acrivos
1995 Donald J. Plazek, University of Pittsburgh
1996 Horst Henning Winter, University of Massachusetts
1997 Gerald G. Fuller
1998 John M. Dealy, McGill University
1999 William B. Russel
2000 L. Gary Leal, University of California at Santa Barbara
2001 Masao Doi, Nagoya University
2002 Ronald G. Larson, University of Michigan
2003 Giuseppe Marrucci, University of Naples
2004 Chris W. Macosko
2005 Jan Mewis, Katholieke Universiteit Leuven
2006 Robert C. Armstrong, MIT
2007 J. F. Brady
2008 Hans Christian Öttinger, ETH Zürich
2009 Gregory B. McKenna, Texas Tech University
2010 Tom C. B. McLeish, Durham University
2011 Eric S. G. Shaqfeh, Stanford University
2012 Ralph H. Colby, Penn State University
2013 Gareth H. McKinley, MIT
2014 Norman J. Wagner, University of Delaware
2015 Hiroshi Watanabe, Kyoto University
2016 Michael Cates,  University of Cambridge
2017 Julia A. Kornfield, California Institute of Technology
2018 Michael Rubinstein, Duke University
2019 Dimitris Vlassopoulos, University of Crete and IESL-FORTH
2020 Ole Hassager, Technical University of Denmark
2021 Jan Vermant, ETH Zurich
2022 Wilson Poon, University of Edinburgh

See also

 List of physics awards

References

Society of Rheology - Bingham Medallists

Rheology awards
Awards established in 1948
American science and technology awards